Astrid Ellena Indriana Yunadi (born June 8, 1990), better known simply as Astrid  Ellena, is an Indonesian model and beauty pageant titleholder who won Miss Indonesia 2011. She was raised in Surabaya, Indonesia and Gaithersburg, Maryland, United States.

She is also an accomplished piano player, and her school years in the United States brought her opportunities to perform live in a few places, including the US State Department. She is an international relations student at Pelita Harapan University. She won several beauty pageants before winning Miss Indonesia in 2011, including Miss Pelita Harapan University. Yunadi was previously educated at Quince Orchard High School in Maryland, United States, graduating as a distinguished honor student.

Yunadi speaks Indonesian fluently, along with some Spanish, Mandarin, and English. She wants to be a diplomat in order to promote Indonesian culture to the world.

Pageantry

Miss Indonesia 2011-Miss World 2011

Astrid Ellena is successor incumbent at 3 June 2011- 28 April 2012 (only 1 year hold the crown) and her crown is given to Miss Indonesia 2012.
Representing East Java,  Yunadi was crowned as Miss Indonesia 2011 on June 3, 2011, at Central Park, Jakarta. She represented Indonesia at the Miss World 2011 Pageant in London, United Kingdom along with contestants from 113 other countries. and placed in the Semifinals (Top 15), Top 10 Talent, and she also won the Miss Beauty With A Purpose award along with Miss Ghana. She was the first Indonesian to place in the semi-finalists in Miss World history.

Personal life
Yunadi's  relationship with her father, Fredrich Yunadi, hasn't been very harmonious, due to a conflict between the two. She was raised only by her mother, Linda Indriani Campbell, after her parents' divorce when she was three years old. According to a statement made by Campbell, Yunadi got no financial support from her father, and Campbell is the one who made it possible for Yunadi to go to school in the United States.

Astrid Yunadi's father also had conflict with her boyfriend, Donny Leimena, who has been reported to the police for defaming Fredrich as a lawyer.

References

Living people
1990 births
Indonesian beauty pageant winners
Miss Indonesia winners
Miss World 2011 delegates
Indonesian people of Chinese descent
People from Surabaya
Indonesian Christians
Pelita Harapan University alumni